Mounir Belhamiti (born 8 March 1985) is a French politician of La République En Marche! (LREM) who was a member of the National Assembly from 5 October 2018 to 16 August 2019, representing Loire-Atlantique's 1st constituency. He was reelected and succeeded to François de Rugy in 2022.

Early life and education 
Belhamiti is Digital Project Manager Engineer.

Political career

Career in local politics 
In the municipal elections of 2014, Belhamiti was elected councilor of Nantes on the list led by the socialist Johanna Rolland. In April 2018, with two other municipal councilors from Nantes, he left the group ecologist and citizen to form the group "Les écologistes en marche".

Member of the National Assembly 
Replacing François de Rugy, Belhamiti became a member of the National Assembly for Loire-Atlantique's 1st constituency, following de Rugy's appointment to the government on September 4, 2018.

In the National Assembly, Belhamiti served on the National Defence and Armed Forces Committee. He was also a member of several Working Groups on digital (Cybersecurity and Digital Sovereignty; Participatory Democracy and e-democracy; Digital economy of data, Knowledge and Artificial intelligence; Internet and Digital society).

See also
 2017 French legislative election

References

1985 births
Living people
Politicians from Nantes
Deputies of the 15th National Assembly of the French Fifth Republic
La République En Marche! politicians
Deputies of the 16th National Assembly of the French Fifth Republic